Dougla people (plural Douglas) are Caribbean people who are of mixed African and Indian descent. The word Dougla (also Dugla or Dogla) is used throughout the Dutch and English-speaking Caribbean.

Definition
The word Dougla originated from doogala, which is a Caribbean Hindustani word that literally means "two-necks" and may mean "many", "much" or "a mix". In the West Indies, the word is used only for mixed race Afro-Indians. The word has its etymological roots in Hindi, where "do" means "two" and "gala" means "throat," potentially referring to people who could speak Indian and African languages.

The 2012 Guyana census identified 29.25% of the population as Afro-Guyanese, 39.83% as Indo-Guyanese, and 19.88% as "mixed," recognized as mostly representing the offspring of the former two groups.

In the French West Indies (Guadeloupe, Martinique), mixed Afro-Indian people used to be called Batazendyen or Chapé-Kouli.

History
There are sporadic records of Indo-Euro interracial relationships, both consensual and nonconsensual, before any ethnic mixing of the African and Indian variety.

Other Indo-based types of mixed heritage (Indo-Chinese (Chindians), Indo-Latino/Hispanic (Tegli), Indo-English (Anglo-Indians), Indo-Portuguese (Luso-Indians), Indo-Irish (Irish Indians), Indo-Scottish (Scottish-Indians), Indo-Dutch, Indo-Arabs and Indo-Amerindian) tended to identify as one of the older, unmixed ethnic strains on the island: Afro, Indo, Amerindian or Euro or passing as one of them.

In Trinidad culture
In 1961, the calypsonian musician Mighty Dougla (born Cletus Ali) described the predicament of Douglas:

Notable Douglas
 Cletus Ali, Trinidadian musician, better known as Mighty Dougla
 Tatyana Ali, Indo-Trinidadian/Afro-Panamanian American actress
 Esther Anderson, actress (United Kingdom; born in Jamaica)
 Johnson Beharry, Grenadian British soldier in the British Army 
 Melissa Bell, Jamaican British singer and mother of Alexandra Burke
 Foxy Brown, rapper (United States; Trinidadian and Tobagonian background)
 Alexandra Burke, British Jamaican singer and daughter of Melissa Bell
 Super Cat, Jamaican deejay
 Sabrina Colie, actress (United States; born in Jamaica)
 Mervyn Dymally, Trinidadian American politician
 Special Ed, rapper (United States; Jamaican background)
 Melanie Fiona, Canadian singer
 Marlene Malahoo Forte, politician (Jamaica)
 Amy Ashwood Garvey, activist (Jamaica)
 Masaba Gupta, actress and fashion designer (Antiguan and Indian)
 Lisa Hanna, Miss World 1993, MP Saint Ann South Eastern
 Kamala Harris, Vice-President of the United States (Jamaican and South Indian)
 Maya Harris, lawyer and writer (Jamaican and South Indian)
 Lester Holt, U.S. news anchor and journalist
 Kenny J, calysonian
 Diana King, singer (United States; born in Jamaica)
 Jeffery Kissoon, actor
 Sonnet L'Abbé, Guyanese Canadian poet
 Sir Trevor McDonald, Trinidadian British news anchor and journalist
 Nicki Minaj, singer, rapper (United States; born in Trinidad and Tobago)
 Nicole Narain, model and actress
 Rajee Narinesingh, LGBT activist (United States; Trinidadian and Tobagonian background)
 Furdjel Narsingh, footballer (Netherlands; Surinamese background)
 Luciano Narsingh, footballer (Netherlands; Surinamese background)
 Roxanne Persaud, politician (United States; born in Guyana)
 Thara Prashad, American singer
 Yendi Phillips, model (Jamaica)
 Thara Prashad, singer and model
 Gema Ramkeesoon, social worker and women's rights activist (Trinidad and Tobago)
 Kenneth Salick, chutney soca singer
 Krishmar Santokie, cricketer
 Abrahim Simmonds, youth advocate (Jamaica)
 Toni-Ann Singh, Miss World 2019 (Jamaica)
 XXXTentacion, rapper
 Justine Skye, entertainer (Jamaica)
 Joyce Vincent, British woman whose death went unnoticed for over two years (Grenadian of Black and Indian ancestry)

See also

 Indo-African (disambiguation)
 Marabou (ethnicity)

References

Further reading
 Barratt, Sue A, and Aleah N. Ranjitsingh. Dougla in the Twenty-First Century: Adding to the Mix. Jackson: University Press of Mississippi, 2021. . See also CUNY Asian and Asian American Research Institute author interview on 19 November 2021.

Ethnic groups in Trinidad and Tobago
Multiracial affairs in the Caribbean
Multiracial affairs in South America

Indo-Caribbean
Afro-Caribbean